St Leonard's Church or similar names may refer to:

Belgium 
St. Leonard's Church, Zoutleeuw

Germany 
St. Leonhard, Frankfurt

Malta 
St Leonard's Church, Kirkop

Poland 
St. Leonard's Church, Lipnica Murowana

Slovenia 
St. Leonard's Church (Jesenice)

United Kingdom

England

Bedfordshire 
Church of St Leonard, Old Warden
Church of St Leonard, Stagsden

Cheshire 
St Leonard's Church, Warmingham

Derbyshire 
St Leonard's Church, Scarcliffe
St Leonard's Church, Shirland

East Sussex 
St Leonard's Church, Aldrington, Brighton and Hove
St Leonard's Church, St Leonards-on-Sea
St Leonard's Baptist Church, St Leonards-on-Sea
St Leonard's Church, the official name of the Church in the Wood, Hollington

Essex 
Church of St Leonard at the Hythe, Colchester

Gloucestershire 
Church of St Leonard, Bledington
Church of St Leonard, Lower Lemington
Church of St Leonard, Stowell Park

Greater Manchester 
St Leonard's Church, Middleton, Greater Manchester

Hampshire 
St Leonard's Church, Hartley Mauditt

Hertfordshire 
St Leonard's Church, Bengeo
St Leonard's Church, Sandridge

Kent 
St Leonard's Church Hythe, Kent

Lancashire 
St Leonard's Church, Balderstone
St Leonard's Church, Downham
New St Leonard's Church, Langho
Old St Leonard's Church, Langho
Church of St Leonard the Less, Samlesbury
St Leonard's Church, Walton-le-Dale

Lincolnshire 
St Leonard's Without, Kirkstead

London 
St Leonard, Eastcheap, City of London
St Leonard, Foster Lane, City of London
St Leonard's Church, Heston, Hounslow
St. Leonard's, Shoreditch, Hackney
St Leonard's Church, Streatham, Lambeth

Nottinghamshire 
St Leonard's Church, Wollaton
St Leonard's Church, Newark

Norfolk 
St Leonard's Church, Mundford

Northamptonshire 
St Leonard's Church, Apethorpe

Shropshire 
St Leonard's Church, Bridgnorth
St Leonard's Church, Linley
White Ladies Priory, now ruined, originally dedicated to St Leonard

Somerset 
Church of St Leonard, Butleigh
Church of St Leonard, Chelwood
Church of St Leonard, Farleigh Hungerford
St Leonard's Church, Marston Bigot
Church of St Leonard, Otterford
Church of St Leonard, Rodney Stoke

Warwickshire 
St Leonard's Church, Spernall

Wiltshire 
St Leonard's Church, Berwick St Leonard
St Leonard's Church, Sutton Veny

Worcestershire 
St Leonard's Church, Cotheridge
St Leonard's Church, Frankley

Scotland 
St Leonard's Church, Perth
St Leonard's-in-the-Fields Church, Perth

United States 
St. Leonard's Church (Boston), Massachusetts
Saint Leonard Catholic Church (Madison, Nebraska)

See also
St. Leo's Church (disambiguation)